Senuran Muthusamy (born 22 February 1994) is a South African cricketer. He made his international debut for the South Africa cricket team in October 2019. Muthusamy can trace his ancestry to India, with family in Nagapattinam.

Domestic career
He was included in the KwaZulu-Natal cricket team squad for the 2015 Africa T20 Cup. In August 2017, he was named in Cape Town Knight Riders' squad for the first season of the T20 Global League. However, in October 2017, Cricket South Africa initially postponed the tournament until November 2018, with it being cancelled soon after.

In September 2018, he was named in KwaZulu-Natal's squad for the 2018 Africa T20 Cup. In April 2021, he was named in North West's squad, ahead of the 2021–22 cricket season in South Africa.

In March 2022, on the opening day of the 2021–22 CSA One-Day Cup tournament, Muthusamy scored his first century in List A cricket, with 100 from 106 balls against Western Province.

International career
In August 2019, he was named in South Africa's Test squad for their series against India. He made his Test debut for South Africa, against India, on 2 October 2019. In the match, he took his first Test match wicket, dismissing the Indian captain, Virat Kohli, who was out caught and bowled for 20 runs.

References

External links
 

1994 births
Living people
South African cricketers
South Africa Test cricketers
KwaZulu-Natal cricketers
Cricketers from Durban